Olgierd Darżynkiewicz (8 March 1923 – 28 February 2000) was a Polish sports shooter. He competed in the trap event at the 1952 Summer Olympics.

References

1923 births
2000 deaths
Polish male sport shooters
Olympic shooters of Poland
Shooters at the 1952 Summer Olympics
Sportspeople from Białystok